Catello Palmigiano (Castellamare di Stabia, just south of Naples, September 18, 1853 - After 1883) was an Italian painter, mainly of genre subjects, often in period costume.

He studied at the Institute of Fine Arts in Naples, but was a resident of Castellamare di Stabia. In 1883 at Rome, he exhibited Fantasia and Ricordi di Castellamare. He exhibited in other cities Neo-Pompeian subjects, including Iltempio di Venere a Pompei. He emigrated to Brazil.

References

19th-century Italian painters
Italian male painters
1853 births
Painters from Naples
Neo-Pompeian painters
Italian costume genre painters
Year of death missing
19th-century Italian male artists